This article includes a list of China's historical gross domestic product (GDP) values, the market value of all final goods and services produced by a nation in a given year. The GDP dollar estimates presented here are either calculated at market or government official exchange rates (nominal), or derived from purchasing power parity (PPP) calculations. This article also includes historical GDP growth.

In 1985, the State Council of China (SCC) approved the establishment of a SNA (System of National Accounting), using GDP to measure the national economy. China started to study and then implement a new system of national economic accounting. In 1986, as the first citizen of the People's Republic of China to receive a Ph.D. in economics from an overseas country, Fengbo Zhang headed Chinese Macroeconomic Research - the key research project of the seventh five-year plan, as well as completing and publishing the Chinese GDP data according to China's own research and calculations. A summary of the above events has been included in the book "Chinese Macroeconomic Structure and Policy" (June 1988) edited by Fengbo Zhang, and collectively authored by the Research Center of the SCC. This is the first GDP data which was published by China.

The research utilized the World Bank's method as a reference, and made numerous appropriate adjustments based on China's national condition. The GDP also has been converted to U.S. dollar-based data by utilizing the moving average exchange rate.  The research systematically completed China's GDP and GDP per capita from 1952 to 1986 and analyzed growth rate, the change and contribution rates of each component. The research also included international comparisons. Additionally, the research compared MPS and SNA, looking at the results from the two systems from analyzing Chinese economy. This achievement created the foundation for China GDP research.

The SCC issued "The notice regarding implementation of System of National Accounting" in August 1992, the Western SNA system officially is introduced to China, replaced Soviet Union's MPS system, Western economic indicator GDP became China's most important economic indicator. Based on Dr. Fengbo Zhang's research, in 1997, the National Bureau of Statistics of China (NBS), in collaboration with Hitotsubashi University of Japan, re-estimated China's GDP Data from 1952 up to 1995 based on the SNA principal. In 2016, the 2008 SNA was formally brought into use.

When comparing Fengbo Zhang's GDP measurement in the 1980s and the GDP in 1997 by the NBS and Japan's cooperative research, the two are found to be very consistent; the deviation rate each year is very slight, between only 0.1% and 7%. During this period, there were many data adjustments, with weighting factors undergoing significant changes along with each year's comparable price amendments, statistical method significant changes result in the substantial deviation. Even with science and technology as advanced as it is today, the single item survey is allowed at least ±3%, or a total of 6% deviation. Despite the extremely difficult conditions of a destroyed economy, blank theory, a lack of data, and simple methods in the 1980s, there is so little deviation for such a long period of time and the comprehensiveness of the national economic indicator, indicates that the research conducted by Fengbo Zhang with the support of the extensive group he trained is extremely rigorous, and their result very precise. Xie Fuzhan, former Director, and Ma Jiantang, current Director of the NBS, both participated in Dr. Fengbo Zhang's research project in the 1980s, as assistant researcher and graduate student, respectively, of the Research Center of the SCC.

Current status

China's nominal GDP surpassed that of Italy in 2000, France in 2005, the United Kingdom in 2006, Germany in 2007, Japan in 2010 and that of the Eurozone in 2018 making China the world's third largest economy after the European Union and United States. But adjusting for purchasing power parity (PPP), China became the world's second largest economy as early as 1999 surpassing Japan, and has toppled America to become the biggest economy since 2014.

From 1979 until 2010, China's average annual GDP growth was 9.91%, reaching a historical high of 15.2% in 1984 and a record low of 3.8% in 1990. Based on the current price, the country's average annual GDP growth in these 32 years was 15.8%, reaching an historical high of 36.41% in 1994 and a record low of 6.25% in 1999.

China NBS data

Annual GDP

GDP by industries

Quarterly GDP 
China's quarterly GDP estimation was formally established in 1992. Afterwards, following the development of SNA of China, quarterly GDP is successively standardized and improved in estimation methodology, accounting classification, accounting procedure, release time and data quality control. Accumulated quarterly GDP estimation is formed. Not only quarterly GDP estimation by industries is established but also quarterly GDP estimation at expenditure approach is being studied. the following is the quarterly GDP list.

Quarterly GDP by US dollars

Comparative data of three International organizations

See also 

 Economy of China
 Economic history of China (1949–present)
 List of Chinese administrative divisions by GDP per capita
 List of Chinese administrative divisions by GDP
 List of Chinese prefecture-level cities by GDP per capita
 List of Chinese prefecture-level cities by GDP
 List of renminbi exchange rates
 List of country subdivisions by GDP over 200 billion US dollars

References

External links 
 China Macroeconomic and Industrial Data

Further reading
 Ta-Chung Liu, Kung-Chia Yeh: The Economy of the Chinese Mainland. National Income and Economic Development, 1933–1959. Princeton N. J. Princeton University Press

GDP
Historical Gdp
China Historical
GDP, China, Historical